Hussein Al-Sadiq (born 16 August 1971) is a Saudi Arabian swimmer. He competed in the 1992 Summer Olympics.

References

1971 births
Living people
Swimmers at the 1992 Summer Olympics
Saudi Arabian male swimmers
Olympic swimmers of Saudi Arabia